The 1961 Kilkenny Senior Hurling Championship was the 67th staging of the Kilkenny Senior Hurling Championship since its establishment by the Kilkenny County Board.

On 17 September 1961, St. Lachtain's won the championship after a 4-05 to 0-12 defeat of Near South in the final. It was their first ever championship title.

Results

Final

References

Kilkenny Senior Hurling Championship
Kilkenny Senior Hurling Championship